Attila Budavári (1 June 1970) is a Hungarian master organ builder. His organ factory, the Pécs Organ Manufactory, is the biggest organbuilding company in Hungary.

Background 
For Attila Budavári the interest of organbuilding was a family heritage coming from his ancestors working at an organbuilding company in Pécs.
His great-great grandfather, Lipót Schiffrich had arrived Pécs from Vienna to work at Angster organbuilding factory. His great grandfather worked at the company as well from his student years and after finishing his studies he continued the work as an organbuilder. Moreover, 5 more ancestors of Attila have also worked at the same organbuilding company which was always great motivation for him.

Education 
Budavári was only 12 years old when he decided to become an organ builder. He attended primary and secondary school in Pécs. After finishing his intermediate studies, he continued his education at Kaesz Gyula Apprenticeship Institution in Budapest, between 1988–1990. In 1991, he went on a study tour so that he becomes to be able to turn his knowledge about organ building into practice. He had spent a year at Oberösterreichische Orgelbauanstalt Kögler GmbH organ building company as an organ builder. After some years of interruption, he has continued his studies — already as a company owner — at the Chamber of Crafts Budapest, at its Instrument crafter and repair branch, where he achieved a master's degree. In 2011 he was officially qualified to a Silver-wreath Organbuilder Master.

Work 
Coming back to Hungary he has found his own company with his brother, Csaba Budavári. The company was started in their parents’ garage but when the company started to develop they had the opportunity to buy a workshop in Pécs, so they continued the work there. During the 25 years of the company it has become the biggest organ manufacturer of Hungary and also one of the biggest in Europe.

In 2009 the company created an online store.

Important projects and works 
Pécs Organ Manufactory have participated in several significant organ installations:
 Palace of Arts, new organ (2006, Budapest Hungary) – Largest organ in Hungary
 Nagyvárad-Szöllős Roman Catholic Church, new organ (2008, Transylvania)
 Zamárdi, new French baroque organ (2010 Zamárdi, Hungary)
 Košice Borrome St. Charles Seminary Church, organ adaptation and expansion (2011, Slovakia)
 Rešica, new organ (2012, Slovakia)
 Fábrica da Igreja Paroquial da Freguesia de Sra da Gloria Aveiro, new organ (2013, Portugal)
 Calvinistic Secondary School of Szentendre, new organ (2013 Budapest, Hungary)
 Calvinistic Parish of Pécs-Kertváros, new organ (2013 Pécs, Hungary) – First organ in Hungary with dual usage slider
 Calvinistic Parish Church Mezőberény, organ restoration (2014 Mezőberény, Hungary
 Matthias Church large organ’s reconstruction (2015, Budapest Hungary)
 Calvinistic Church Kálvin Sq. Budapest, new historic mechanic organ (2015, Budapest Hungary)
 Reformed Church of Fasor, organ reconstruction (2015, Budapest Hungary)
 Zaláta Calvinistic Church, I/8, 2016. Restoration.
 Mátraverebély-Szentkút National Shrine, II/27, 2016. New organ.SOKÓŁ Małopolska Cultural Center, Nowy Sacz, Poland, III/68, 2017. Modernization, expansion.
 Lutheran Church of Buda Castle, Budapest, III/26, 2017. Baroque style new

Awards 
 Pro Civitate Award (2015)
 Ambassador díj (2015)
 József Angster Award (2011) – joint award with Csaba Budavári

References

Further reading 
 "A világ legjobb orgonái Pécsett készülnek". Pécsi Hírek (13 July 2015)
 "Meghódította a világot a pécsi orgonamanufaktúra". Pécsi Hírek (19 October 2015)
  "Pécs város napja" (2015)
 "Kitüntetések a Kamarában"
 "Munkánkat hosszú időre, generációkra tervezzük"
 "A Pécsi Orgonaépítő Manufaktúra Kft. munkái"
 https://web.archive.org/web/20170730070205/http://www.pomorgona.hu/en/pom/story
 http://www.evangelikus.hu/taxonomy/term/2448
 http://ecpecs2015.hu/hu/muhelyvezetok/198/dobay-balazs-

1970 births
Living people
Hungarian pipe organ builders